The Musée de l'Ancien Évêché (Museum of the Former Bishopric) is a departmental museum located in Grenoble, France and dedicated to the Isère heritage through the history of its Bishop's palace. Inaugurated in 1998, it is settled in the former Bishop's palace, near Grenoble Cathedral. The museum gives access to the remains of an early Christian baptistry and to a section of the vestiges of the Gallo-Roman wall in the basement of the building.

Permanent exhibition 
The permanent exhibition Isère through History displays items and paintings relating to the development of Isère from pre-history to the present day.  The museum also shows regularly temporary exhibitions of local artists. In December 2014, a public garden was inaugurated near the entrance.

Temporary exhibitions 
 Diodore Rahoult from November 2013 to May 2014
 The Alps of Doisneau from November 2012 to September 2013
 He Yifu. The journey of a Chinese painter in the Alps  from November 2010 to February 2011
 Jules Flandrin. works from 1889 to 1914, from November 2008 to April 2009
 Grenoble. Visions of a city, from November 2007 to April 2008
 Alexandre Debelle, from February 2006 to May 2006
  The Isère heritage in comics, from November 2004 to May 2005
 Painter (s) in Proveysieux, from October 2003 to May 2004
 Carthusian monasteries in Europe, from October 2002 to May 2003
 Abbé Calès, a man, an artist, from September 2001 to April 2002
 The Tour du Pin triptych, from April 2000 to July 2001

Access 
The B tramline: Notre-Dame-Musée station.

See also 
 Cularo

References

External links 
 

Museums in Grenoble
Archaeological museums in France
History museums in France
1998 establishments in France
Monuments historiques of Isère
Episcopal palaces